Pseudomonas libanensis is a Gram-negative, rod-shaped, fluorescent, motile bacterium isolated from natural springs in Lebanon. Based on 16S rRNA analysis, P. libanensis has been placed in the P. fluorescens group.

References

External links
Type strain of Pseudomonas libanensis at BacDive -  the Bacterial Diversity Metadatabase

Pseudomonadales
Bacteria described in 1999